The women's Kurash 63 kilograms competition at the 2018 Asian Games in Jakarta, Indonesia was held on 29 August at the JCC Assembly Hall.

Kurash is a traditional martial art from Uzbekistan that resembles wrestling. There are three assessment system in Kurash, namely Halal, Yambosh, and Chala. Halal is if an athlete Kurash is able to slam his opponent in the back. Yambosh is the imperfect of Halal, two Yambosh same as Halal.

Schedule
All times are Western Indonesia Time (UTC+07:00)

Results

Final

Top half

Bottom half

References

External links
Official website

Women's 63 kg